Wild Romance is a 2006 Dutch biopic about Dutch singer and artist Herman Brood. It follows the previous films depicting Brood, the 1979 feature film Cha Cha and the 1994 documentary Rock n Roll Junkie. Named for Brood's backing band, the film received its premiere on the day that Brood would have turned 60 on November 5, 2006.

The film deals with the early period of Brood's music career up to the period of success with the album Shpritsz, and Shpritsz was to have been the title of the film. In particular the film deals with Brood's relationships with manager Koos van Dijk, his band Wild Romance and German singer Nina Hagen with whom Brood was romantically involved.

Plot summary
The film opens in 2001, Herman Brood, having written his suicide note, on the roof of the Hilton Hotel. As he prepares to jump, the film flashbacks thirty years prior to when Herman achieved great success as a singer (1974–1979). In 1976, Brood is evicted from the band Cuby + Blizzards, the penniless and drug dependent Brood nonetheless manages to find gigs in the Groningen bar scene. When he plays his bar, Brood attracts the attention of Winschoten bar owner Koos van Dijk, who becomes his manager. Under the inspirational leadership of van Dijk, Brood puts together a band he calls Herman Brood & His Wild Romance. Playing venues at home and abroad Brood and his band eventually find success especially with their album Shpritsz, and the hit single "Saturday Night". Dreaming of global success, they embark on a tour of the United States.

Cast
 Daniël Boissevain - Herman Brood
 Marcel Hensema - Koos van Dijk
 Karina Smulders - Nina Hagen
 Joke Tjalsma - mother of Herman
 Maarten Rischen - Dany Lademacher
 Helge Slikker - Freddie Cavalli
 Joop Bonekamp - Cees Meerman
 Andy Nyman - Leo Leitner

Awards
 Rembrandt Award for Best Dutch Actor - Daniël Boissevain
 Golden Calf for best actor - Marcel Hensema
 Gouden Uien 2007 for the biggest box office flop of the year

External links
 
 Official film website

2006 films
Dutch biographical films
Dutch rock music films
Films set in the 1970s
Films set in 2001
Films set in Amsterdam
Films about suicide
Films directed by Jean van de Velde
Herman Brood
Cultural depictions of rock musicians
Cultural depictions of Dutch men
Biographical films about singers